The Open Season film series from Sony Pictures Animation consists of the animated film Open Season (2006) and its three direct-to-video sequels Open Season 2 (2008), Open Season 3 (2010), and Open Season: Scared Silly (2015) along with a short film Boog and Elliot's Midnight Bun Run (2007).

Films

Open Season (2006)

In the tranquil town of Timberline, a 900-pound grizzly bear named Boog has his perfect world turned upside down after he meets Elliot, a one-antlered mule deer. After Elliot messes up Boog's nature show, they end up tranquilized by Boog's owner Ranger Beth and then her friend Sheriff Gordy tells her to release them into the Timberline National Forest before open season for only 3 days. But when hunting season comes, it is up to Boog and Elliot to rally all the other forest animals and turn the tables on the hunters. In the end, Boog decides to stay in the forest and says goodbye to Beth (who had returned to take Boog home).

Open Season 2 (2008)

One fine spring morning, Elliot gets all prepared for his big wedding with Giselle. But little do they know, Bob and Bobbie have left a trail of dog treats in the forest for Mr. Weenie to follow, which he does and he ends up getting taken back to his original home by his owners. Elliot sees this, tells the story to Boog and the others, and they all make a mission to go save their friend before he gets turned back into a pet. In the end, Mr. Weenie thought he goes back with the wilds, but instead he decides to remain a pet once again and go live with Bob and Bobbie and the other domestics.

Open Season 3 (2010)

Boog wakes up early in his cave one spring morning and prepares for a guy's trip to start spending more time with his male friends. Unfortunately, they all decline because of family obligations; this makes Boog feel bad and take Dinkleman with him on the trip, only to discover it is not a guys trip with only one guy. He then stumbles upon a poster of the Russian Maslova Family Circus, where he meets a devious look-alike named Doug, his llama friend Alistair, and a skilled girl bear named Ursa (with whom he falls madly in love). When Doug tricks Boog into letting him switch places, Elliot and the wilds find out about this and set out to rescue their beloved bear friend (especially as the circus is going back to Russia sooner or later), with Elliot being the leader once again. In the end, Ursa decides to live with Boog and his best friends since he doesn't want to leave her or Elliot and the guy's trip becomes a success.

Open Season: Scared Silly (2015)

A few months after the events of the third film, Elliot tells a campfire story about the legend of the Wailing Wampus Werewolf that is said to live in the Timberline National Forest one night. Boog is terrified by the story and decides to "chicken out" of their annual camping trip until he knows that the werewolf is gone. Determined to help Boog overcome his fears, Elliot, Mr. Weenie, and the other woodland animals band together to scare the fear out of Boog and uncover the mystery of the Wailing Wampus Werewolf.

Former hunter Shaw, now a tour guide, returns to Timberline to get revenge on Boog and Elliot for defeating him and witnesses an unseen creature in the forest (which turns out to be Ian, a deer who is Elliot’s rival, in a disguise). Shaw begs Gordy to reopen hunting season and he reluctantly does so. Despite being told to only hunt down the werewolf, Shaw becomes determined to not only catch it, but also hunt down Boog and Elliot. To carry out his plan, Shaw recruits his old friends Ed and Edna, the owners of Poutine Palace, a restaurant serving poutine. Meanwhile, a heartbroken Elliot catches the werewolf by himself after Boog angrily breaks up with him. As Boog walks through the forest, Elliot’s girlfriend Giselle catches up to him and tries to convince him that Elliot was trying to help him overcome his fear and that Elliot is headed toward Dead Bear Gulch, but fails.

Meanwhile, a starving Mr. Weenie starts to believe that he is the werewolf. At Dead Bear Gulch, Elliot and Mr. Weenie are both caught by the werewolf, who is actually Shaw in a costume; fortunately, Boog and his friends leap to the rescue. Shaw is eventually overpowered and defeated, permanently shutting down open season. Gordy meets up with Boog, having recognized the bear's handiwork in defeating Shaw, and rewards him with a few treats. The animals then discover that the werewolf is real, but Elliot befriends him by dancing with him as he joins their campout. The next morning, Bobbie and Bob happily return to their RV with Mr. Weenie, and Bobbie tells Mr. Weenie that today is his birthday. The werewolf asks Boog to wear the female werewolf costume one more time, but Boog angrily refuses.

Possible fifth film
In an interview with ComicBook in 2016, Open Season: Scared Silly director David Feiss hinted at the possibility of a fifth film stating: "You can never be too sure, but I have a feeling that we will be seeing an Open Season 5. Everybody likes the characters and the movie and the way it turned out, so I would be surprised if there wasn’t a Open Season 5. I know people want to do another."

Short film

Boog and Elliot's Midnight Bun Run (2007)

A short film titled Boog and Elliot's Midnight Bun Run is featured on the Open Season DVD and Blu-ray.

Releases

Box office performance

Critical response

Cast and crew

Cast

 Note: A dark gray cell indicates the character does not appear in the film.

Crew

Video game
 Open Season is a video game, loosely based on the first movie, and it was released by Ubisoft on September 18, 2006, on PlayStation 2, PlayStation Portable, Microsoft Windows, Game Boy Advance, Xbox 360, Xbox, Nintendo DS, and GameCube. A Wii version was released on November 30, 2006.

References

Film series introduced in 2006
Animated film series
Comedy film series
Children's film series
 
Sony Pictures Animation franchises